Chan Yung-jan and Zheng Jie were the defending champions, but both decided not to participate.
Chan Hao-ching and Kristina Mladenovic defeated Chang Kai-chen and Olga Govortsova 5–7, 6–2, [10–8] in the final.

Seeds

Draw

Draw

References
 Main Draw

OEC Taipei WTA Ladies Open - Doubles
Taipei WTA Ladies Open